Al-Arabi is a professional basketball club based in the city of Unaizah in the Al Qassim Province, Saudi Arabia that formerly played in the Saudi Premier League.

See also 

 Al-Arabi sport club

External links
Team profile at Asia-basket.com

Basketball teams established in 1996
Basketball teams in Saudi Arabia
Sport in Unaizah